Lovesongs for Underdogs is the solo debut album by American singer Tanya Donelly, who had formerly recorded with Throwing Muses, The Breeders, and Belly. It was released on August 9, 1997. Two singles were released for promotion of the album. "Pretty Deep" was released in July 1997, while "The Bright Light" was released in October 1997. In the U.S both 4AD released singles were released in two parts, each including 2 newly released B-Sides. "Pretty Deep" featured "Spaghetti", "Morna", "These Days" and "Influenza". "The Bright Light" featured "Bury My Heart", "How Can You Sleep?", "Life On Sirius" and "Moon Over Boston". A music video for each single was produced and aired on Vh1 and MTV2. Both videos differed highly in creative and artistic direction from previous Belly videos and exclusively featured Tanya solo, in movie like settings. "Pretty Deep" and "The Bright Light" enjoyed heavy airplay on Triple A radio stations in the U.S Northeast. "Lovesongs For Underdogs" peaked at #36 on the Official UK Albums Chart for 2 weeks upon its release. The singles, "Pretty Deep" and "The Bright Light" peaked at #55 and #65 (the latter) for 2 weeks each upon their 2 CD Single releases.

Track listing
All songs by Tanya Donelly except where noted.
"Pretty Deep" – 4:22
"The Bright Light" – 3:21
"Landspeed Song" – 3:34
"Mysteries of the Unexplained" – 4:52
"Lantern" – 3:10
"Acrobat" (Donelly, Dean Fisher) – 3:30
"Breathe Around You" – 2:56
"Bum" – 3:09
"Clipped" – 4:01
"Goat Girl" – 2:16
"Manna" – 5:26
"Swoon" – 4:27

Personnel
Tanya Donelly – guitar, keyboards, vocals
Dean Fisher – acoustic guitar, bass guitar, percussion, accordion, keyboards
Wally Gagel – bass, percussion, keyboards, drum machine
Rich Gilbert – guitar, accordion, bass, keyboards, saw
Stacy Jones – drums
David Lovering – drums
Hilken Mancini – background vocals
David Narcizo – drums
Chris Toppin – background vocals
Jonathan Williams – electric guitar

Production
Producers: Tanya Donelly, Wally Gagel, Gary Smith
Engineers: Matthew Ellard, Wally Gagel, Dan McLoughlin
Assistant engineers: Jesse Henderson, Suzanne Kapa, Kelly Wohlford
Mixing: Wally Gagel, Paul Q. Kolderie, Sean Slade
Mixing assistant: Dave Kirkpatrick
Mastering: Brian Lee
Drum Technician: Carl Plaster
Arrangers: Tanya Donelly, Wally Gagel
Design: Chris Bigg
Photography: Andrew Catlin

Charts
Album – Billboard (North America)

The album was very popular in the Northeast, hitting Billboard's Northeast Heatseekers chart, and remaining for 4 weeks.

References

Tanya Donelly albums
1997 debut albums
Albums produced by Gary Smith (record producer)
4AD albums
Sire Records albums